Elisabeth von Knobelsdorff (17 June 1877 Potsdam – 20 April 1959 Bassum) was a German engineer, and architect.

Early life 
Her parents were the Major General Heinrich Wilhelm Kurt von Knobelsdorff (born 13 April 1850) and Marie Elizabeth Fancis Gertrud Dyhrenfurth (born 17 September 1856).

Education 
In 1906, Elisabeth von Knobelsdorff graduated from the Munich Realgymnasium. In 1907, she began studying architecture at the TH Charlottenburg, first as a guest student, after the admission of women at the universities in the Kingdom of Prussia in 1909.
She finished her studies in 1911, as the first woman in Germany with the diploma in engineering.

Career 
In 1912, she became the first female member of the Association of Architects and Engineers in Berlin (AIV) and took part in the exhibition "The Woman in Home and Work", a showcase of the women's movement. The organizers of this exhibition included her aunt Gertrud Dyrenfurth (1862-1946), who lived on the estate of the family in Jakobsdorf near Wroclaw. Elisabeth von Knobelsdorff designed a community center for the Silesian village, which was built in 1915. It remained until 1946, the social center of Jakobsdorf.

In World War I, she worked as a "field architect in the rank of lieutenant" in the military building administration in Doberitz near Potsdam, and at the German Army High Command in occupied Belgium. After World War I, she worked as an architect at the provincial government in Potsdam. In 1921, she passed the state examination for the building authority, and was again appointed as the first woman in Germany, master builder for the government.

In 1922, she married Kurt Wilhelm Viktor von Tippelskirch, Legation manager in the Foreign Office, and was then released in 1923 (as married) from the civil service. She then worked freelance as an architect in Berlin-Charlottenburg, until she accompanied her husband to the United States in 1927.

After returning in 1938, the couple lived in Jakobsdorf, from where she was expelled at the end of World War II. 
Elisabeth von Knobelsdorff lived in Bassum near Bremen from 1946 until her death in 1959.

References

External links 

1877 births
1959 deaths
Engineers from Brandenburg
20th-century German architects
20th-century German engineers
20th-century German women artists
German expatriates in the United States
German military engineers
German military personnel of World War I
German women in World War I
German women architects
German women engineers
People from Potsdam
Technical University of Berlin alumni
20th-century women engineers